The 2015–16 Denver Pioneers men's basketball team represented the University of Denver during the 2015–16 NCAA Division I men's basketball season. The Pioneers, led by ninth year head coach Joe Scott, played their home games at Magness Arena and were members of The Summit League. They finished the season 16–15, 7–9 in Summit League play to finish in sixth place. They defeated Nebraska–Omaha in the quarterfinals of The Summit League tournament to advance to the semifinals where they lost to South Dakota State.

On March 11, head coach Joe Scott was fired. He finished at Denver with a nine year record of 146–132.

Roster

Schedule

 
|-
!colspan=9 style="background:#880029; color:#D0CCAE;"| Non-conference regular season

|-
!colspan=9 style="background:#880029; color:#D0CCAE;"| The Summit League regular season

|-
!colspan=9 style="background:#880029; color:#D0CCAE;"| The Summit League tournament

References

Denver Pioneers men's basketball seasons
Denver